Parvati is a major goddess in Hinduism.

Parvati, Parvathi or Parvathy may also refer to:

People 
 Parvati (given name), an Indian female given name (including a list of persons with the name)

Places
 Parvati (Vidhan Sabha constituency), one of the Legislative Assembly constituencies of Maharashtra
 Parvati Hill, a hill in Pune, Maharashtra
 Parvati River (Himachal Pradesh)
 Parvati Valley, an Indian river valley in Himachal Pradesh
 Parvathi Puthannaar, a canal in Kerala
 Pin Parvati Pass, a mountain pass in Himachal Pradesh

Other uses 
 Parbati River (disambiguation)
 2847 Parvati, a main-belt asteroid

See also